Ilario Monterisi (born 19 December 2001) is an Italian footballer who plays as a defender for  club Frosinone, on loan from Lecce.

Career
On 31 August 2021, he joined Catanzaro on a season-long loan. On 17 January 2022, he moved on a new loan to Fidelis Andria.

On 1 July 2022, Monterisi moved on loan to Frosinone.

Club statistics

Club

References

2001 births
Living people
People from Trani
Footballers from Apulia
Italian footballers
Association football defenders
Serie A players
Serie B players
Serie C players
S.S.C. Bari players
U.S. Lecce players
U.S. Catanzaro 1929 players
S.S. Fidelis Andria 1928 players
Frosinone Calcio players
Sportspeople from the Province of Barletta-Andria-Trani